Palmer High School is a high school located in the Matanuska-Susitna Borough in the city of Palmer, Alaska. It offers classes in fine arts, mathematics, world languages, physical education and health, science, English, social sciences, and career and technical education.  Student support services are available for students.

Sports
Palmer High School's sports include, baseball, wrestling, swimming, diving, cross country running, cross country skiing, track and field, football, ice hockey, volleyball, e-sports, and soccer.

Machetanz Field is located on campus.

History
The school was established in 1936.

Curriculum
The foreign languages offered are French and Japanese. IB classes (see below) are offered in Humanities/Literature, Math, Biology, Chemistry, History, Music, Art, Agriculture, and Foreign Languages. In 2012 the school began offering the APEX online education program.

International Baccalaureate
Palmer High School has been an International Baccalaureate World School since 1999. It is one of two International Baccalaureate schools in Alaska.

Notable alumni
 Talis Colberg (1976), former Alaska State Attorney General

References

External links
 Palmer High School homepage

Public high schools in Alaska
Schools in Matanuska-Susitna Borough, Alaska
International Baccalaureate schools in Alaska